WSEY (95.7 FM, "Sky 95.7") is a radio station licensed to Oregon, Illinois, covering Northern Illinois, including Rockford, Dixon, and Freeport. WSEY currently airs an adult contemporary format and is owned by NRG Media.

History

The station began broadcasting December 27, 1999, airing Christmas music, beginning its oldies format in January 2000. The station's format would later shift to classic hits. Two decades later in February 2020, WSEY changed its format and branding as Sky 95.7 broadcasting an adult contemporary format.

References

External links
WSEY's website

Mainstream adult contemporary radio stations in the United States
SEY
NRG Media radio stations
Radio stations established in 1999
1999 establishments in Illinois